Tetraposthia is a monotypic genus of worms belonging to the family Actinoposthiidae. The only species is Tetraposthia colymbetes.

References

Acoelomorphs